Elena Ramírez Parra (born 1972) is a Spanish botanist and researcher who studies the negative effects of environmental stress (drought, salinity of the soil, excess radiation, presence of heavy metals and the high and low temperatures) on plant growth. Applications of her research include improving harvest yield. In 2010, Ramírez won a L'Oréal-UNESCO Award for Women in Science.

Life
Ramírez studied biological sciences at the Autonomous University of Madrid and a doctorate in molecular biology from the same university (2000). Ramírez is a published scholar of botany.

She became a senior researcher at the Centre for Plant Biotechnology and Genomics (Centro de Biotecnología y Genómica de Plantas, CBGP) of the National Instituto Nacional de Investigación y Tecnología Agraria y Alimentaria (INIA) and the Technical University of Madrid (UPM), studying the negative effects that produce environmental stress in plants.

Her investigation characterises the mechanisms that plants use to respond to external stresses like drought, soil salinity, heavy metals and extreme temperatures. She tries to create a generation of new plant varieties that will improve harvests.

In November 2010, she was awarded, with four scientists (Isabel Lastres Becker, Ana Briones Alonso, Mercedes Vila and María Antonia Herrero), the L'Oréal-UNESCO Awards for Women in Science. This endowment of €15000 is to reward the work of women scientists younger than 40.

See also 

 List of Spanish inventors and discoverers

 List of female scientists in the 21st century

References 

1972 births
Autonomous University of Madrid alumni
Place of birth missing (living people)
21st-century Spanish women scientists
Living people
Molecular biologists
Soil scientists
21st-century Spanish botanists
Hybridisers
Date of birth missing (living people)
Academic staff of the Technical University of Madrid
Women molecular biologists
Environmental scientists
Spanish women botanists